The Subject is a 2020 American drama film directed by Lanie Zipoy, starring Jason Biggs, Anabelle Acosta, Nile Bullock, Caleb Eberhardt, Aunjanue Ellis, Carra Patterson and Brian McManamon.

Cast
 Jason Biggs as Phil Waterhouse
 Anabelle Acosta as Jess Rivas
 Nile Bullock as Malcolm Barnes
 Caleb Eberhardt as Kwame Johnson
 Aunjanue Ellis as Leslie Barnes
 Carra Patterson as Marley Reed
 Brian McManamon as Peter

Release
The film was released in theatres and on TVOD on 22 October 2021.

Reception
Monique Jones of Common Sense Media rated the film 4 stars out of 5 and called it "intense", "engaging" and "mature".

Lovia Gyarkye of The Hollywood Reporter called the film a "fascinating conceit" which "struggles to deliver".

Sarah Bea Milner of ScreenRant rated the film 2 stars out of 5 and wrote that while the film is "full of promise", it is "ultimately disappointing".

References

External links
 
 

American drama films
2020 drama films